Benjamin Alan Braden (born March 9, 1994) is an American football guard who is a free agent. He played college football at Michigan.

Professional career

New York Jets
Braden signed with the New York Jets as an undrafted free agent on May 7, 2017. He was waived on September 2, 2017, and was signed to the practice squad the next day. He signed a reserve/future contract with the Jets on January 1, 2018.

Braden made the Jets initial 53-man roster in 2018, but was later waived on September 12, 2018, and was re-signed to the practice squad. He was promoted to the active roster on November 28, 2018.

On August 31, 2019, Braden was waived by the Jets and signed to the practice squad the next day. He was released on September 10.

Green Bay Packers
On September 12, 2019, Braden was signed to the Green Bay Packers practice squad. He was released on November 7, 2019.

New York Jets (second stint)
On November 13, 2019, Braden was signed to the New York Jets practice squad. He was promoted to the active roster on December 28, 2019. He was waived on August 3, 2020.

New England Patriots
On August 17, 2020, Braden was signed by the New England Patriots. He was waived on September 5, 2020.

Green Bay Packers (second stint)
Braden was signed to the Green Bay Packers practice squad on October 21, 2020. He was promoted to the active roster on October 24. He was waived on October 26, and re-signed to the team's practice squad two days later. He was elevated to the active roster on November 5, December 5, and December 12 for the team's weeks 9, 13, and 14 games against the San Francisco 49ers, Philadelphia Eagles, and Detroit Lions, and reverted to the practice squad after each game. He was promoted to the active roster on January 2, 2021. On August 31, 2021, Packers released Braden as part of their final roster cuts, and he was subsequently signed to the practice squad the next day. He was elevated to the active roster on October 28, 2021. He was promoted to the active roster on November 23, 2021 and released on January 10, 2022, following the conclusion of the regular season. He was signed back to the practice squad the next day.

Denver Broncos
On March 14, 2022, Braden signed with the Denver Broncos. He was waived/injured on August 15, 2022.

References

External links
Denver Broncos bio
Michigan Wolverines bio

1994 births
Living people
American football offensive guards
Denver Broncos players
Green Bay Packers players
Michigan Wolverines football players
New England Patriots players
New York Jets players
People from Rockford, Michigan
Players of American football from Michigan